Río Gallegos is the capital and largest settlement of the Patagonian province of Santa Cruz in Argentina.

Established on 19 December 1885 to increase Argentine power over southern Patagonia, Río Gallegos became the capital of the then Territory of Santa Cruz in 1888, retaining its status when the territory became a province in 1957. Néstor Kirchner, later President of Argentina, served as the city's mayor from 1987 to 1991 and is interred in a mausoleum in the city's cemetery.

History

In 1525 Spanish explorer García Jofre de Loaísa became the first European to reach the Gallegos River, and named it Río San Idelfonso. Simón de Alcazaba y Sotomayor's 1535 expedition was the first to name the river "Río Gallegos". The area was not settled by Europeans until much later, with the settlement established 19 December 1885, when the Argentine government wished to better express its sovereignty over southern Patagonia – a naval base was created which increased the development of the town. Between 1912 and 1920, the government encouraged settlers from the Falkland Islands and southern Chile with preferential farming conditions. Some 3,000 arrived and boosted the town. As sheep-farming increased, Río Gallegos became the principal port for exporting sheep and their products. The Pioneers Museum is a preserved old Patagonian house exhibiting the life of the early settlers.

Governor Ramón Lista decided to move the Territorial Capital from Puerto Santa Cruz to Río Gallegos in 1888; official ratification of this decision came on 19 May 1904. The Cathedral of Our Lady of Luján was consecrated in 1900. The Territory of Santa Cruz was declared a Province in 1957, with Mario Cástulo Paradelo as its first Governor.

In the 1982 Falklands War, the city airport was base of Argentine Air Force Mirage III interceptors and A-4 Skyhawks strike aircraft.

Néstor Kirchner, President of Argentina from 2003 to 2007, was mayor of Río Gallegos between 1987 and 1991. His mausoleum is in the city and a street bears his name.

Today, Río Gallegos is an important city of the Argentine far south, with military bases and an international airport. Flights between Chile and Mount Pleasant Airport on the Falkland Islands stop at Río Gallegos once a month.

Wildlife

Birds in the area include the thrush, rhea, chingolo (rufous-collared sparrow), Chilean flamingo, upland goose and black-necked swan. Grey foxes are predators on the sheep ranched in the city. Other animals found in the area include the guanaco.

On the outskirts of Rio Gallegos there is a wide variety of native plants, including calafates, anartrofilos, oxalis, violets and pansies, paper flowers, calceolarias, hipoqueris, leucerias, perezias, senecios, mata arrears, senecio miser, amancay, lilies, lily of the field.

Sport
Rio Gallegos' main association football club is Boca Rio Gallegos of the Torneo Argentino B, the fourth tier of Argentine football. Founded 12 October 1945 by meat factory workers, the side share their crest and kit with Boca Juniors of Buenos Aires, Argentina's most successful club, and have played in the national league system since 1988.
Rio Gallegos' oldest association football club are Boxing Club founded August 1920 and Hispano Americano founded 17 December 1925 .

Images

Climate

Rio Gallegos has a cold semi-arid climate (BSk, under the Köppen climate classification). The climate is dry, windy and cold, with occasional snow during the winter. It is one of the windiest cities on earth, with winds above  being commonplace, and over  not exceptional. Summers are extremely windy and cloudy, with days reaching a cool  and nights dropping to a relatively cold . Cold weather can occur at any time, and despite the very low precipitation, light drizzle and cloudy days are quite common, resulting in only 1441 hours of bright sunshine or 32.2% of possible sunshine.

See also

1949 Tierra del Fuego earthquake

References

Municipality of Río Gallegos – Official website.
Rio Gallegos Online Information – Online Information in Spanish.

Argentum21 – Rio Gallegos
Video Footage of the City – YouTube
Video Footage of the City 2 – YouTube
Noticias Online – Diario La Opinión Santa Cruz

Populated places in Santa Cruz Province, Argentina
Capitals of Argentine provinces
Port settlements in Argentina
Populated places established in 1885
Populated coastal places in Argentina
Cities in Argentina
1885 establishments in Argentina
Argentina
Santa Cruz Province, Argentina